Balamau is a constituency of the Uttar Pradesh Legislative Assembly covering the city of Balamau in the Hardoi district of Uttar Pradesh, India. Balamau is one of five assembly constituencies in the Misrikh Lok Sabha constituency. Since 2008, this assembly constituency is numbered 160 amongst 403 constituencies.

Election results

2022

2017
Bharatiya Janata Party candidate Ram Pal Verma won in last Assembly election of 2017 Uttar Pradesh Legislative Elections defeating Bahujan Samaj Party candidate Neelu Satyarthi by a margin of 22,888 votes.

References

External links
 

Assembly constituencies of Uttar Pradesh
Politics of Hardoi district